Enrique Lizalde Chávez (January 9, 1937 – June 3, 2013) was a Mexican film, television and theater actor whose career spanned from the 1960s to the 2000s. He appeared in dozens of films and television shows, including telenovelas, throughout his career.

Lizalde began his career in the early 1960s. His film roles included Corona de lágrimas in 1968 and El Monasterio de los Buitres in 1973. Lizalde's numerous telenovela credits included Chispita, Dulce desafío, María la del Barrio, Alcanzar una estrella, Esmeralda (Mexican TV series), and La usurpadora.

He was the first actor to portray Juan del Diablo on the original 1966 Mexican telenovela, Corazón salvaje. He was later cast as Noel Mancera in the 1993 remake of Corazón salvaje. His last telenovela series were Amor sin maquillaje in 2007 and Mañana es para siempre in 2009.

Lizalde died on Monday, June 3, 2013, at his home in Mexico City, aged 76.

Filmography

Films
He Matado a un Hombre (1964) - Carlos
Black Wind (1965) - Jorge Iglesias
Nosotros los Jovenes (1966) - Julio Jr. 
Estratregia Matrimonio (1966) - Raul
Corona de lágrimas (1968) - Fernando Chavero 
El Monasterio de los Buitres (1973)

Telenovelas 
La mentira (1965 TV series) - DemetrioCorazón salvaje (1966 TV series) (1966) - Juan del Diablo
 Barata de primavera (1975-1976) - Eduardo LozanoChispita (1982-1983) - Alejandro de la MoraDulce desafíoCorazón salvaje (1993 telenovela) - Noel ManceraMaría la del BarrioAlcanzar una estrellaEsmeralda (Mexican TV series)La Usurpadora - Alessandro Farina (1998)Entre el amor y el odio - Rogelio Valencia (2002)Amor sin maquillaje (2007) - Himself Mañana es para siempre (2008-2009) - Lic. Manuel RamosPorque el amor manda'' (2012-2013) - Sebastián Montemayor

References

External links

1937 births
2013 deaths
Mexican male film actors
Mexican male television actors
Mexican male telenovela actors
Mexican male stage actors
Male actors from Nayarit
People from Tepic